Phosphatidylinositol-4-phosphate 3-kinase C2 domain-containing beta polypeptide is an enzyme that in humans is encoded by the PIK3C2B gene.

Function 

The protein encoded by this gene belongs to the phosphoinositide 3-kinase (PI3K) family. PI3-kinases play roles in signaling pathways involved in cell proliferation, oncogenic transformation, cell survival, cell migration, and intracellular protein trafficking. This protein contains a lipid kinase catalytic domain as well as a C-terminal C2 domain, a characteristic of class II PI3-kinases. C2 domains act as calcium-dependent phospholipid binding motifs that mediate translocation of proteins to membranes, and may also mediate protein-protein interactions. The PI3-kinase activity of this protein is sensitive to low nanomolar levels of the inhibitor wortmannin. The C2 domain of this protein was shown to bind phospholipids but not Ca2+, which suggests that this enzyme may function in a calcium-independent manner.

References

Further reading